Astal Kenar (also Romanized as Astal Kenār) is a village in Sakht Sar Rural District, in the Central District of Ramsar County, Mazandaran Province, Iran. At the 2006 census, its population was 158, in 46 families.

References 

Populated places in Ramsar County